Janova Lehota  is a village and municipality in Žiar nad Hronom District in the Banská Bystrica Region of central Slovakia.

History
In historical records, the village was first mentioned in 1487 as a German settlement founded by a certain Drexler and belonging to Esztergom  archbishopric. In 1776 it passed to Banská Bystrica bishopric.

Genealogical resources

The records for genealogical research are available at the state archive "Statny Archiv in Banska Bystrica, Slovakia"

 Roman Catholic church records (births/marriages/deaths): 1687-1896 (parish A)

See also
 List of municipalities and towns in Slovakia

External links
https://web.archive.org/web/20071027094149/http://www.statistics.sk/mosmis/eng/run.html.  
http://www.tourist-channel.sk/janova-lehota
http://www.e-obce.sk/obec/janovalehota/janova-lehota.html
https://web.archive.org/web/20070521072749/http://janovalehota.virtualne.sk/
http://www.janovalehota_zs.szm.sk/ 
Surnames of living people in Janova Lehota

Villages and municipalities in Žiar nad Hronom District